Afonso Manuel Abreu de Freitas (born 7 April 2000) is a Portuguese professional footballer who plays as a left-back for the Primeira Liga club Vitória Guimarães.

Club career
Freitas is mostly a youth product of Vitória Guimarães, and had a short stint in his youth development in Italy with Juventus from 2016 to 2018. He returned to Vitória Guimarães to finish his training, and was promoted to their B-team where he was a starter. On 4 June 2021, he signed a professional contract with the club until 2023. On 8 August 2022, he was promoted to their senior team and renewed his contract until 2025. He made his senior debut with Vitória Guimarães in a 1–0 Primeira Liga loss to Casa Pia on 29 August 2022.

References

External links
 
 
 

2000 births
Living people
Sportspeople from Guimarães
Portuguese footballers
Association football fullbacks
Vitória S.C. players
Vitória S.C. B players
Primeira Liga players
Campeonato de Portugal (league) players
Portuguese expatriate footballers
Portuguese expatriates in Italy
Expatriate footballers in Italy